Henry Lorenzen (8 February 1899 – 22 September 1961) was a Danish film actor.

Selected filmography
 Girls of Today (1933)
 The Champion of Pontresina (1934) 
 Tales from the Vienna Woods (1934)
 Punks Arrives from America (1935)
 The Grey Lady (1937)
 His Best Friend (1937)
 Nanette (1940)
 Five Suspects (1950)
 Dutch Girl (1953)
 The Missing Miniature (1954)
 Your Life Guards (1955)
 Love, Dance and a Thousand Songs (1955)
 The Simple Girl (1957)
 Voyage to Italy, Complete with Love (1958)
 The Angel Who Pawned Her Harp (1959)
 The Green Archer (1961)

References

Bibliography
 Giesen, Rolf. Nazi Propaganda Films: A History and Filmography. McFarland, 2003.

External links

1899 births
1961 deaths
Danish male film actors